is a Japanese pop rock band formed in 1982 which achieved commercial success by blending soul and funk musical styles. They also use the style of rakugo.

History

1982–1997: Commercial success
Kome Kome Club was founded in 1982 by vocalist Tatsuya Ishii (sometimes credited as "Carl Smoky Ishiii") and fellow members. They released their debut single and album in October 1985. In 1990, "Roman Hikō" became a hit song. In 1992, "Kimi ga Iru Dake de" topped the Oricon chart, remaining in the charts for 33 weeks. It was the fifth best-selling song in Japan since Oricon's establishment, and the second best-selling J-Pop single, slightly behind Southern All Stars' "TSUNAMI", (released in January 2000). "Kimi ga Iru Dake de" was written around the marriage of band members Minako (also Ishii's sister) and Kaneko, the saxophone/keyboardist.

Drummer Ryo-J and guitarist Joplin Tokunoh parted ways with the band in 1995. Ishii tried to continue the band, but in the end he officially dissolved it in March 1997.

2006–present: Reunion
With the two members returning, the band reformed in the middle of 2006 for a series of concerts as well as a few new recordings, including "Well Come 2", which spurred a video where the band members were depicted as toys (complete with enlarged doll-like heads, UPC bar codes and one, "James" Onoda Yasuhide bursting out of his "box").  The video also gives a nod to all of its members by having a screen shot with their name and them playing in the scene, this includes members of Big Horns Bee and Sue Cream Sue. It is a part of Sony Music Japan.  Sony has frequently had appearances of the "Well Come 2" video on various streaming websites pulled while leaving other videos from the same DVD online.

A combined CD/DVD release featured a parody of the "hentai" (aka "racy') videos where the two dancers (Minako and Mari, also known as "Sue Cream Sue") dance to songs of Kome Kome in various states of dress and undress (and strange costumes like animals).  However, this being 20 years later, their costumes are not as skimpy as the ones in their famed "Costume Dance" videos during Kome Kome's heyday.  They do poke a bit of fun with it and guitarist, Be, narrates over the slow-motion action when their skirts fly up a little.

Although there was a very long layoff, "Well Come 2" still became a Top 10 hit on the Oricon charts. On October 22, 2006, they announced that they completely revoked their breakup. In September 2007, their new studio album komedia.jp was released. On December 31, 2007, they took part in the 58th NHK Kōhaku Uta Gassen.

Members

 Carl Smoky Ishii: Vocal
 James Onoda: Vocal, Chorus
 Bon: Bass
 be: Guitar
 Flash Kaneko: Saxophone, Keyboards, Flute
 Toshi: Drums
 RYO-J: Drums
 Joplin Tokunoh: Guitar
 Mataro: Percussion, Chorus
 Machiko: Chorus
 Juliano Katsumata: Keyboards
 Kohtaro: Dance
 Shinji: Dance

 SCS (Sue Cream Sue)
 Minako: Vocal, Dance (younger sister of Ishii and wife of Kaneko)
 Mari: Vocal, Dance, Percussion
 B.H.B. (Big Horns Bee)
 G.I. Gyo: Trumpet
 Himarayan Shimogami: Trumpet
 Kawai Wakaba: Trombone, Saxophone
 Orita Nobotta: Saxophone, Flute
 Fussy Kobayashi: Trumpet

See also
 List of best-selling music artists in Japan

References

Musical groups established in 1982
Japanese pop music groups
Comedy rock musical groups
Sony Music Entertainment Japan artists
1982 establishments in Japan